Michael Gallagher (born 1951) is a political scientist. He is Professor of Comparative Politics and head of the Department of Political Science at the Trinity College Dublin.

Education
Trained as a computer scientist, Gallagher combines his understanding of statistical analysis with his interests in politics. He holds a B.A. from Lancaster, two M.Sc. degrees, one from Essex and one from Strathclyde. He completed his Ph.D. at the University of Strathclyde.

Career
Gallagher created the Gallagher index, a least squares index of proportional representation that measures an electoral system’s disproportionality between votes received and seats allotted in a legislature. His research interests include Irish politics, comparative political institutions, and political parties.

Gallagher is the author, co-author or editor of eighteen books, including The Politics of Electoral Systems (2005, co-edited with Paul Mitchell), Politics in the Republic of Ireland (4th ed., 2005, co-edited with John Coakley), and Representative Government in Modern Europe (4th ed., 2006, co-edited with Michael Laver and Peter Mair), which are standard textbooks in their fields. He has also written around 70 journal articles and book chapters (his most cited independent work is "Proportionality, Disproportionality and Electoral Systems" in Electoral Studies [1991]), and serves on the editorial boards of various journals in the discipline, including Electoral Studies, European Journal of Political Research, Representation, Party Politics and Irish Political Studies. Gallagher was president of the Political Studies Association of Ireland, from 1994 to 1996.

Works
 How Ireland Voted 2020: The End of an Era (Palgrave Macmillan, 2021)
How Ireland Voted 2016: the election that nobody won (Basingstoke, 2016)
 How Ireland Voted 2011: the full story of Ireland's earthquake election (Basingstoke, 2011)
How Ireland Voted 2007 (Palgrave, 2008)
How Ireland Voted 2002 (Palgrave, 2003)
 Representative Government in Modern Europe, 5th ed (Maidenhead, 2011)
 Politics in the Republic of Ireland, 5th ed (London, 2010)
 Irish Elections 1948–77: results and analysis (Routledge and PSAI Press, 2009)
 The Politics of Electoral Systems, paperback edition (Oxford, 2008)
 How Ireland Voted 2007 (Basingstoke, 2008); including chapter on betting and the election

References

External links
 Michael Gallagher's TCD Website.
 Political Science at Trinity College, Dublin.
 Michael Gallagher's Electoral Systems web site with a variety of datasets and some tools for calculating disproportionality.
 Cover art, for a selection of Michael Gallagher's books.

1951 births
Living people
Irish political scientists